John I ( [ʒuˈɐ̃w̃]; 11 April 1357 – 14 August 1433), also called John of Aviz, was King of Portugal from 1385 until his death in 1433. He is recognized chiefly for his role in Portugal's victory in a succession war with Castile, preserving his country's independence and establishing the Aviz (or Joanine) dynasty on the Portuguese throne. His long reign of 48 years, the most extensive of all Portuguese monarchs, saw the beginning of Portugal's overseas expansion. John's well-remembered reign in his country earned him the epithet of Fond Memory (de Boa Memória); he was also referred to as "the Good" (o Bom), sometimes "the Great" (o Grande), and more rarely, especially in Spain, as "the Bastard" (Bastardo).

Early life 
John was born in Lisbon as the natural son of King Peter I of Portugal by a woman named Teresa, who, according to the royal chronicler Fernão Lopes in the Chronicle of the King D. Pedro I, was a noble Galician. In the 18th century, António Caetano de Sousa found a 16th-century document in the archives of the Torre do Tombo in which she was named as Teresa Lourenço. In 1364, by request of Nuno Freire de Andrade, a Galician Grand Master of the Order of Christ, he was created Grand Master of the Order of Aviz.

On the death without a male heir of his half-brother, King Ferdinand I, in October 1383, strenuous efforts were made to secure the succession for Beatrice, Ferdinand's only daughter. As heir presumptive, Beatrice had married king John I of Castile, but popular sentiment was against an arrangement in which Portugal would have been virtually annexed by Castile. The 1383–1385 Portuguese interregnum followed, a period of political anarchy, when no monarch ruled the country.

Acclamation 

On 6 April 1385, the Council of the Kingdom (the Portuguese Cortes) met in Coimbra and declared John, then Master of Aviz, to be king of Portugal. This was followed by the liberation of almost all of the Minho in the course of two months as part of a war against Castile in opposition to its claims to the Portuguese throne. Soon after, the king of Castile again invaded Portugal with the purpose of conquering Lisbon and removing John I from the throne. John I of Castile was accompanied by French allied cavalry while English troops and generals took the side of John of Aviz (see Hundred Years' War). John and Nuno Álvares Pereira, his constable and talented supporter, repelled the attack in the decisive Battle of Aljubarrota on 14 August 1385. John I of Castile then retreated. The Castilian forces abandoned Santarém, Torres Vedras and Torres Novas, and many other towns were delivered to John I by Portuguese nobles from the Castilian side. As a result, the stability of the Portuguese throne was permanently secured.

On 14 February 1387, John I married Philippa of Lancaster, daughter of John of Gaunt, who had proved to be a worthy ally. The marriage consolidated an Anglo-Portuguese Alliance that endures to the present day.

Reign 

John I of Castile died in 1390 without issue from his wife Beatrice, which meant that a competing legitimate bloodline with a claim to the throne of Portugal died out. John I of Portugal was then able to rule in peace and concentrate on the economic development and territorial expansion of his realm. The most significant military actions were the siege and conquest of the city of Ceuta by Portugal in 1415, and the successful defence of Ceuta from a Moroccan counterattack in 1419. These measure were intended to help seize control of navigation off the African coast and trade routes from the interior of Africa.

The raids and attacks of the Reconquista in the Iberian Peninsula created captives on both sides who were either ransomed or sold as slaves. The Portuguese crown extended this practice to North Africa. After the attack on Ceuta, the king sought papal recognition of the military action as a Crusade. Such a ruling would have enabled those captured to be legitimately sold as slaves. In response to John's request, Pope Martin V issued the Papal bull Sane charissimus of 4 April 1418, which confirmed to the king all of the lands he might win from the Moors. Under the auspices of Prince Henry the Navigator, voyages were organized to explore the African coast. These led to the discovery of the uninhabited islands of Madeira in 1417 and the Azores in 1427; all were claimed by the Portuguese crown.

Contemporaneous writers describe John as a man of wit who was very keen on concentrating power on himself, but at the same time possessed a benevolent and kind demeanor. His youthful education as master of a religious order made him an unusually learned king for the Middle Ages. His love for knowledge and culture was passed on to his sons, who are often referred to collectively by Portuguese historians as the "illustrious generation" (Ínclita Geração): Edward, the future king, was a poet and a writer; Peter, the Duke of Coimbra, was one of the most learned princes of his time; and Prince Henry the Navigator, the duke of Viseu, invested heavily in science and the development of nautical pursuits. In 1430, John's only surviving daughter, Isabella, married Philip the Good, Duke of Burgundy, and enjoyed an extremely refined court culture in his lands; she was the mother of Charles the Bold.

Marriage and descendants

On 2 February 1387, John I married Philippa of Lancaster, daughter of John of Gaunt, 1st Duke of Lancaster, in Porto. From that marriage were born several famous princes and princesses of Portugal (infantes) that became known as the "illustrious generation".

Ancestry

Notes

References

Williamson, D. 1988. Debrett's Kings and Queens of Europe
Ana Echevarría Arsuaga: Catalina de Lancaster,  edit. Nerea, 2002. ).

1357 births
1433 deaths
14th-century Portuguese monarchs
15th-century Portuguese monarchs
House of Aviz
Illegitimate children of Portuguese monarchs
Knights of the Garter
People from Lisbon
People of the 1383–1385 Portuguese interregnum
Sons of kings